Silver Lake Forest Service Strip  is a public airport located three miles (4.8 km) southwest of Silver Lake in Lake County, Oregon, United States.

External links

Airports in Lake County, Oregon
United States Forest Service